Thomas or Tom Daley may refer to:

Tom Daley (born 1994), English diver
Tom Daley (baseball) (1884–1934), American baseball player
Tom Daley (footballer) (1933–2020), English footballer
Joe Daley (ice hockey) (Thomas Joseph Daley, born 1943), retired ice hockey goaltender

See also
Thomas Dale (disambiguation)
Thomas Daly (disambiguation)
Tom Daly (disambiguation)
Thomas Vose Daily (1927–2017), Catholic bishop